Events in the year 2023 in the United Arab Emirates.

Incumbents

Events 
Ongoing: COVID-19 pandemic in the United Arab Emirates

Scheduled 

 June: 2023 World Para Powerlifting Championships
 2022–23 UAE Pro League
 4–6 November: 2023 United Nations Climate Change conference is scheduled to be held in Dubai.
 Unknown: SeaWorld Abu Dhabi is scheduled to open in 2023.

Deaths 

 2 February – Mohammed Saeed Al Mulla, 97, banker and politician.

References 

 
Years of the 21st century in the United Arab Emirates
United Arab Emirates
United Arab Emirates
2020s in the United Arab Emirates